Holybourne is a village in the East Hampshire district of Hampshire, England. It is 1.3 miles (2.2 km) northeast of the centre of Alton, is contiguous with it and shares its A31 bypass. The nearest railway station also being in Alton.

The village has a population of around 1,500 and is where Treloar School is located. Holybourne has a pub – The White Hart – and a small store.

History

Holybourne is recorded in the Domesday Book of 1086 as Haliborne and appears in 1418 as Halybourn.

The name is thought to be derived from the Old English Haligburna which means sacred stream, referring to the small stream whose spring is near Holybourne Church whence it runs through the village.

English author Elizabeth Gaskell (1810–1865) bought a house in Holybourne in 1865.  She died suddenly when visiting the house on 12 November 1865.

Being located close to the former RAF Lasham airfield gliders are often spotted in the sky.

RAF Odiham is home to the British Chinooks and has a flight path over the village at a low level allowing excellent views of the aircraft.

Cuckoo's corner, near the end of the village, has the remains of a Roman road and often finds are found in surrounding fields and cricket pitches.

There is one pub in the village, The White Hart along with a small shop cum post office.

Complins Brewery
In the nineteenth century, a brewery was established in Holybourne by Walter Complin, who died in 1890. By the start of the 20th century, it was run by John Fowler Complin. The site is now occupied by a residential area called Complins.

Economy

Holybourne Oil Terminal

In 1984, planning permission was granted for the Holybourne Oil Terminal, rail served by the Alton Line, to be the trans-shipment point for production from the Humbly Grove oil field, Lasham, delivery of the oil to be by pipeline. In 1989, further permission was granted to deliver a limited amount of crude oil by road tanker. The freight trains serving Holybourne arrive at Holybourne Freight railway station.

Church of the Holy Rood

The Church of the Holy Rood in Holybourne has foundations dating from the 12th century, and the nave, west end and lower part of the tower appear to date from this time. The chancel was added later, completing the building by the 13th century. However, two centuries later the floor of the building was raised, possibly because of nearby springs. The north aisle was replaced in 1879.

New bells 
In autumn 2009, eight new bells manufactured at the Whitechapel Bell Foundry were installed in the church by Whites Bellhangers, of Appleton, Oxon, who cleaned up the existing three bells and re-hung them on a new bell frame installed higher up in the steeple and connected them back to the clock to continue their chiming role.

The new eight bells are in the key of B, and the heaviest (Bell No 8) weighs 6 cwt 3 qtrs 16 lb.  They are inscribed and dedicated as follows:
 No 1 Bell: Jane Austen, writer, 1775–1817
 No 2 Bell: Elizabeth Gaskell, writer, 1810–1865
 No 3 Bell: William Curtis, botanist, 1746–1799
 No 4 Bell: Alfred Munnings, painter, 1878–1959 (the famous equestrian artist, who resided at The White Hart, Holybourne).
 No 5 Bell: Edmund Spenser, poet, 1552–1599
 No 6 Bell: Edward Thomas, poet, 1878–1917
 No 7 Bell: Izaak Walton, angler & biographer, 1593–1683
 No 8 Bell: Rev. Gilbert White, curate & naturalist, 1720–1793
On Sunday, 11 October 2009, there was a Service of Consecration of the eight new bells. On Sunday, 15 November 2009, there was a Service of Dedication by Michael Harley, the Archdeacon of Winchester.

Further reading
 Anon Church of the Holy Rood, Holybourne July 2011 (available from the church)

See also 
 Holybourne Hill, one of the highest points in Hampshire, rises nearby.

References

External links

Holybourne
Extract from White’s Directory 1859
Stained Glass Windows at Holy Rood, Holybourne, Hampshire

Villages in Hampshire